The Mu to E Gamma (MEG) is a particle physics experiment dedicated to measuring the decay of the muon into an electron and a photon, a decay mode which is heavily suppressed in the Standard Model by lepton flavour conservation, but enhanced in supersymmetry and grand unified theories. It is located at the Paul Scherrer Institute and began taking data September 2008.

Results
In May 2016 the MEG experiment published the world's leading upper limit on the branching ratio of this decay:

at 90% confidence level,  based on data collected in 2009–2013. This improved the MEG limit from the prior MEGA experiment by a factor of about 28.

Apparatus
MEG uses a continuous muon beam (3 × 107/s) incident on a plastic target.  The decay is reconstructed to look for a back-to-back positron and monochromatic photon (52.8 MeV).  A liquid xenon scintillator with photomultiplier tubes measure the photon energy, and a drift chamber in a magnetic field detects the positrons.

The MEG collaboration presented upgrade plans for MEG-II at the Particles and Nuclei International Conference 2014, with one order of magnitude greater sensitivity, and increased muon production, to begin data taking in 2017. More experiments are planned to explore rare muon transitions, such as Mu2e and Mu3e.

References

External links 

 MEG-II experiment record on INSPIRE-HEP

 

Particle experiments